David M. Posner (November 4, 1947 - October 19, 2018) was an American rabbi who led the flagship reform temple, Temple Emanu-El, in New York, NY for 40 years as a congregational rabbi. He died from complications of Alzheimer's disease

Posner was a scholar of comparative Semitic languages, including Aramaic and Syriac.

Biography 
Posner was born in Atlantic City to Ralph and Doris (Silver) Posner. His mother was a homemaker who later became a schoolteacher. His father was an executive at a shipping logistics company.  When he was a child, the family moved to Brownsville, Brooklyn, where he attended Meyer Levin Junior High School and Samuel J. Tilden High.

Immediately following his ordination from Hebrew Union College in Cincinnati in 1973, Posner joined the rabbinical staff of Temple Emanu-El. Known as the consummate congregational rabbi, the New York Times wrote that he was "a thoughtful, meticulous man, not a showboat", and that "rather than forming institutes or posing with politicians, he liked to stay at the temple — his battle station, as he called it — waiting for his congregants to call." In 1998, he received the Doctor of Divinity degree, honoris causa from Hebrew Union College.

Awards and recognition 
 2007, ranked 23rd most influential rabbi in America in Newsweek's Top 50 Rabbis in America
2014, received Dr. Bernard Heller Prize from Hebrew Union College - Institute of Religion

References 

Hebrew Union College – Jewish Institute of Religion alumni
Reform rabbis
1947 births
2018 deaths